Ueyama (written: 上山 lit. "upper mountain") is a Japanese surname. Notable people with the surname include:

 (born 1976), Japanese mixed martial artist
 (1921–2012), Japanese philosopher

Japanese-language surnames